Timothy Selwood (1 September 1944 – 10 February 2021) was an English cricketer who played for Middlesex as an opening batsman between 1966 and 1973. He struggled at first-class level, failing to make a half-century for Middlesex, though he did make a career-best 89 during a one-off season for Central Districts in 1972–73. Selwood spent the remainder of his career playing for Middlesex's 2nd XI, as well as league and club cricket, before going on to coach Finchley Cricket Club in the Middlesex Premier League. His son, Steven, also played first-class cricket.

References

External links
 

1944 births
2021 deaths
People from Prestatyn
Sportspeople from Denbighshire
Welsh cricketers
Middlesex cricketers
Central Districts cricketers
Durham cricketers
Place of death missing